A Doll's House is a play by Henrik Ibsen.

A Doll's House, Doll's House, or The Doll's House may also refer to:

Film and TV
 A Doll's House (1911 film), a short silent film starring Marie Eline, William Russell and Marguerite Snow
 A Doll's House (1917 film), an adaptation directed by Joe De Grasse
 A Doll's House (1918 film), an adaptation directed by Maurice Tourneur
 A Doll's House (1922 film), an adaptation directed by Charles Bryant and starring his wife Alla Nazimova
 A Doll's House (1943 film), an adaptation directed by Ernesto Arancibia
 A Doll's House (1956 film), a Swedish film adaptation directed by Anders Henrikson
 A Doll's House (1959 film), a television film adaptation directed by George Schaefer
 A Doll's House (1973 Garland film), an adaptation directed by Patrick Garland
 A Doll's House (1973 Losey film), an adaptation directed by Joseph Losey
 A Doll's House (1992 TV drama), a television adaptation directed by David Thacker
 Doll's House (TV series), a 2007-2009 Bangladeshi soap opera

Literature
 The Doll's House (novel), a 2013 novel by Tania Carver
 "The Doll's House" (short story), by Katherine Mansfield
 The Doll's House, a 1947 children's book by Rumer Godden
The Sandman: The Doll's House, the second volume of the comic book series The Sandman

Other uses
 A Doll's House, working title of the 1968 Beatles album The Beatles ("the White Album")

See also
The House of Dolls, a 1955 novella by Yehiel De-Nur (as Ka-Tzetnik 135633)
Dollhouse (disambiguation)